The Cannon Creek Bridge is a historic bridge in rural western Madison County, Arkansas. The bridge is located southeast of Durham, carrying County Road 5340 across Cannon and Coon Creeks. Built in 1929 to carry Arkansas Highway 16, it is the only known surviving curved concrete deck bridge in the state. It was bypassed by the present alignment of Highway 16 in the 1980s.

The bridge was listed on the National Register of Historic Places in 2004.

See also
National Register of Historic Places listings in Madison County, Arkansas
List of bridges on the National Register of Historic Places in Arkansas

References

Road bridges on the National Register of Historic Places in Arkansas
Bridges completed in 1929
Transportation in Madison County, Arkansas
National Register of Historic Places in Madison County, Arkansas
Concrete bridges in the United States
1929 establishments in Arkansas